Webers Circus is an Australian travelling circus founded by Natalie and Rudy (Rüdiger) Weber in 2007 after dissolving a partnership of 13 years with Rudy's brother Harry who still runs the Weber Bros Circus in New Zealand. Natalie's mother is Janice Lennon of the Stardust Circus.

See also
List of circuses and circus owners

References

External links

The History of The Weber Bros Circus (New Zealand)
, Cumberland Newspapers

Australian circuses
2007 establishments in Australia
Entertainment companies established in 2007
Performing groups established in 2007